The Robert E. Lee School is a historic former school building at 3805 West 12th Street in Little Rock, Arkansas.  Now a local community and social service center, this collegiate Gothic two-story masonry building was built in 1906-07 and twice enlarged.  The original design was by Gibb & Sanders, and the additions were by Theo Sanders (1910) and Thomas Harding, Jr. (1930).  The city used the building as a school until 1971.  In the 1990s it was used as a teacher training facility, and was in 2005 repurposed as a community center.

The building was listed on the National Register of Historic Places in 2009.

See also
National Register of Historic Places listings in Little Rock, Arkansas

References

School buildings on the National Register of Historic Places in Arkansas
Collegiate Gothic architecture in Arkansas
School buildings completed in 1906
National Register of Historic Places in Little Rock, Arkansas
1906 establishments in Arkansas
Schools in Pulaski County, Arkansas
Community centers in Arkansas